Dodangeh Rural District may refer to:
 Dodangeh Rural District (Hurand County)
 Dodangeh Rural District (Khuzestan Province)

See also
 Dodangeh-ye Olya Rural District
 Dodangeh-ye Sofla Rural District